Enteromius subinensis is a species of ray-finned fish in the genus Enteromius which is endemic to Ghana.

References

 

Endemic fauna of Ghana
Enteromius
Fish described in 1965